Barbara Jude "Breezy" Bishop was born September 7, 1935. 
girls' basketball coach at Western Senior High School in Baltimore, Maryland.
She built one of the nation's top high school programs during 24 seasons at Western. Bishop was inducted into the Women's Basketball Hall of Fame in 2000.

Early life

She had three brothers who served in the Army, Navy, and Marines. Her grandmother knew that Breezy would make her contribution to sports.
In her early teen years, her mother and grandmother were concerned because she always played sports with the boys in her neighborhood. They were so concerned that they sent Breezy to Girl Scout camp.
It increased her curiosity in other sports like swimming, hiking, and canoeing.

In high school, she played basketball, softball, and track and field. Breezy wanted to major in physical education in college but she did not have the support from her father so he did not help her out financially. She later dropped out of college after two years.

Coaching career
Towson State University – Tigers
1979–80 (15–9)
1980–81 (6–18)
1981–82 (15–8)
1982–83 (15–9)

Started teaching and coaching career in September 1970 at Western High School
Western Senior High School – Doves
1994–95
1993–94
1992–93
1991–92
1990–91
1989–90
1988–89
1987–88
1986–87
1985–86
1984–85
1983–84
Record: 411 Wins 39 losses

Coached on a collegiate level 
 Johns Hopkins University
 Coppin State University 
 Towson University
 North Carolina State University

During her collegiate level, she had a total of 96 wins and 23 losses
She had a total of 600 wins and 127 losses in her coaching career

Coaching awards and recognition
 Inaugural Breezy Bishop Classic
 Built one of the nation's top high school programs during 24 seasons at Western Senior High School (Baltimore, Maryland)
 Compiled an overall record of 424–24, winning back-to-back Maryland State Championships in 1994 and 1995 and 17 Baltimore City Championships with her teams consistently ranked among the nation's best by USA
 Was selected as the WBCA National High School Coach of the Year in 1995 as well as a head coach for the WBCA Girls' High School All-America Game.
 Inducted into the Women's Basketball Hall of Fame in 2000.
 Named Coach of the Year in 1984, 1990, 1995 by the Baltimore Suns
 1995 she was selected by Converse WBCA National Coach of the Year
 In 1995 she was selected to be a part of the United States Olympics Festival games as an assistant coach 
 She set up a college fund for students at Western High School in Baltimore, Maryland

Notes

External links

High school basketball coaches in Maryland
NC State Wolfpack women's basketball coaches
Living people
American women's basketball coaches
1935 births